The 2017–18 Honduran protests were occurring throughout the country since the 2017 general election.

Background 

On 30 November, with approximately 94% of the votes counted, Hernández's lead had climbed to 42.92% compared to 41.42% for Nasralla. On 1 December, the TSE announced that they would give no further results until the TSE had been able to review all of the 1,031 tally sheets which had not been properly filled out by the political parties. The 1,031 tally sheets represent 5.69% of the total vote. Later that same day, as the TSE was still trying to convoke 60 representatives and four supervisors for both Nasralla and Hernández for the final vote count, Hernández's cabinet announced a ten-day curfew from 6pm to 6am to try to calm the violence associated with the protests.

On 2 December, the Honduran National Roundtable for Human Rights issued a press release, in which it declared that the government actions were state terrorism against civilians, it warned that the declaration of a state of exception was in order to create repression to ensure electoral fraud labeling it as illegal after reading several articles of the Honduran constitution.

Timeline 

As of 2 December, at least 7 people had died in the protests with more than 20 injured. On the second night of the curfew, thousands of people participated in what is known as "cacerolazos", banging pots and pans in protest.

As of 15 December 2017, the court had finished a recount of ballot boxes that presented irregularities but had still not declared a winner, and protests continued throughout the country, with 16 deaths and 1,675 arrests, according to Honduras' National Human Rights' Commission. The court has 30 days from the contest to do so.

The TSE finally announced a winner on 17 December, giving Hernández the victory with 42.95% of the vote to Nasralla's 41.42%. The announcement sparked a new wave of protests across the country, with Mel Zelaya announcing a national strike. The country's two major cities - Tegucigalpa and San Pedro Sula - saw streets blockaded, their main exits blocked, and traffic between them severely reduced.

Organization of American States (OAS) election monitors, in their final report, documented widespread and numerous irregularities in the conduct of the voting and ballot tabulation, and doubted the validity of the official results. OAS secretary general Luis Almagro issued a statement following the TSE's announcement saying: "Facing the impossibility of determining a winner, the only way possible so that the people of Honduras are the victors is a new call for general elections." Hernández rejected the OAS's position, and his top aide accused of OAS of seeking "to try and steal the election" for Nasralla.

See also 
 Honduran general election, 2017
 2009 Honduran constitutional crisis
 List of protests in the 21st century
 2019 Honduran protests 
 2015 Honduran protests

References

2017 in Honduras
Honduras
2017 riots
2018 in Honduras
Honduran
2018 riots
Protests in Honduras
Riots and civil disorder in Honduras
Protests against results of elections